José Gómez Lucas (9 January 1944 – 14 June 2014) was a Spanish cyclist. He competed at the 1968 Summer Olympics, finishing 15th overall in the individual road race and 12th overall with the Spanish team in the team time trial. As a professional, Gómez was the overall general classification winner of the 1970 Vuelta a Andalucía, the 1971 Tour de Menorca and the 1972 Klasika Primavera. He retired from racing after the 1975 Vuelta a España.

Major results
1966
 1st in 2nd Stage Tour de l'Avenir
1968
 1st in 7th Stage Giro della Valle d'Aosta
1970
 1st Overall General classification Vuelta a Andalucía
 1st Overall Sprint classification Volta a Catalunya
1971
 1st Overall General classification Tour de Menorca
 1st in 1st Stage Tour de Menorca
1972
 1st Overall General classification Klasika Primavera

References

External links
 

1944 births
2014 deaths
Spanish male cyclists
Olympic cyclists of Spain
Cyclists at the 1968 Summer Olympics
Cyclists from Madrid